HV Aalsmeer, also known as HV Greenpark Tigers Aalsmeer due to sponsorship reasons is a men's handball club from Aalsmeer, Netherlands, that plays in the NHV Eredivisie and BENE-League

The men's team of HV Aalsmeer was able to the national championship ten times. The most recent was in 2019.

Titles 
BENE-League :
 Winners (1) : 2009, 2017

NHV Eredivisie :
 Winners (10) : 1954, 1985, 1995, 2000, 2001, 2003, 2004, 2009, 2018, 2019

Dutch Cup :
 Winners (6) : 1987, 1989, 1998, 2000, 2004, 2008

Team

Current squad 
Squad for the 2018-2019 season 

Goalkeepers
 Gabriel Birjovanu
 Marco Verbeij 

Wingers
RW
  Robin Boomhouwer 
  Micheal Kampsteeg
LW 
  Nils Dekker
  Quinten Ouderland
Line players 
  Samir Benghanem

Back players
LB
  Tim Bottinga 
  Remco Van Dam
CB 
  Erik Blaauw
  Vaidas Trainavicius
RB
  Jim Castien
  Rob Jansen 
  Marwin Van Offeren

External links
Official website

References

Dutch handball clubs
Aalsmeer